The Rolls-Royce Silver Cloud is a luxury automobile produced by Rolls-Royce Limited from April 1955 to March 1966. It was the core model of the Rolls-Royce range during that period. The Silver Cloud replaced the Silver Dawn and was, in turn, replaced by the Silver Shadow. The J. P. Blatchley design was a major change from the pre-war models and the highly derivative Silver Dawn. As part of a range rationalisation the Bentley S1 is very similar, apart from its radiator grille.

Models

Silver Cloud

Construction is body-on-frame, which permitted special bodied versions, though the overwhelming majority were built with the standard Pressed Steel Company manufactured steel body shell. A light-weight aluminium alloy was used for doors, bonnet/hood and boot/trunk lid. The chassis is a simple steel box section, welded together and very rigid. The engine is a 155 hp / 4000 rpm  six-cylinder unit with inlet over exhaust valves: twin SU carburettors were added in September 1957. The standard transmission was a four-speed automatic, the General Motors designed Hydramatic transmission.

Brakes are hydraulic and assisted by the Rolls-Royce mechanical servo with  drums and suspension was independent coils at the front and semi-elliptic springs at the rear. Twin brake master cylinders were incorporated from April 1956.

Power steering and air conditioning became available as options in 1956.

The test car cost £5078 including taxes.

The coachbuilder Harold Radford offered conversions of the 4-door saloon into an estate car. One of these conversions, chassis no. LSMH65, sold in March 2017 for $583,000 (inclusive of applicable buyer's fee) at RM Sotheby's Amelia Island auction.

Silver Cloud II

The Silver Cloud II was introduced in 1959. It was little changed externally, but was given a new Rolls-Royce developed 6.2 L V8 engine, which pushed the weight to 2.11 tonnes. Power steering became standard. Electrically operated windows were now available as an option.

Although the improved performance of the new car was welcomed, commentators of the time noted that the V8-engined Silver Cloud II was neither as quiet nor as smooth as the straight-six-cylinder-engined Silver Cloud I, despite the new engine's hydraulic tappet operation.  The new wet-linered V8 was also a little cramped in an engine bay intended originally for a narrower unit: in order to change the spark plugs it was necessary to remove the front wheel on the car's right side.  There seems to have been a problem with crankshaft breakages in the earlier V8s: this was blamed on lack of lubrication to the bearings.

The basic architecture of the Silver Cloud II did not change between 1959 and 1963, but there were numerous minor changes implemented, notable among them a succession of improvements to the ventilation system.  Interior changes in 1961 included the adoption of blue instrument lighting, the introduction of a combined indicator / headlamp flasher switch and of a handbrake warning light. A remodelled rear light assembly was introduced in May 1962 and a change to single sealed-beam headlamps was made in August 1962.

The Motor magazine tested a Series II in 1960. The test car cost £6092 including taxes.

Silver Cloud III

The Silver Cloud III was first displayed to the public at the Paris salon at the beginning of October 1962 but along with the Bentley S3 the cars were displayed on a specialist coachwork stand as if the modifications were to the special order of a particular customer. The compression ratio was increased to 9:1, reflecting the higher octane levels of premium fuel in major markets, although the option of a lower 8:1 compression ratio was still offered in markets where non-availability of higher octane fuels might be an issue. Rolls-Royce, as before, refused to disclose overall engine power output, but indicated that there had been an improvement of "perhaps 7%". Increased power and weight reduction boosted speed and performance slightly. The engine now included a nitride hardened crankshaft to reflect the extra power being generated and in response to reports of broken crankshafts in the earlier V8 Silver Clouds. The transmission was a GM Hydramatic which Rolls-Royce used under licence.

The headlights were grouped in a four-headlamp layout subsequently continued in the later Silver Shadow. Other external changes included a slightly increased slope of the bonnet to correspond with a  reduction in radiator grille height.

Between 1963 and 1966 there were no major changes. Stainless steel wheel trims replaced chrome-plated ones in April 1963, and an improved rear window demister was introduced in November of the same year.  Wider front seats were fitted in January 1964, and five months later a revised headlamp surround now incorporated a very small RR monogram. A chrome badge reading "Silver Cloud III" in an italic font can be seen on the right bottom side of the boot of most UK and European delivered examples, whilst US versions were delivered without this badge.

As with earlier models, Rolls-Royce continued to make the Silver Cloud chassis available to traditional coachbuilders. A notable version is the Fixed Head and Drop Head Coupe styled by Mulliner Park Ward, having unusual slanted headlights, also found on contemporary Italian designed or Italian-influenced high performance cars from Lancia, Triumph, Lagonda and Gordon-Keeble. It was derived from the earlier Park Ward design for the Bentley S1 and S2 Continentals, made also available for the S3. Some 100 of the 328 coach-built Silver Cloud IIIs were of this style.

Production
 Silver Cloud: 2,238
 Silver Cloud Long Wheelbase: 85
 Silver Cloud special coachbuilder styles (convertibles, coupes etc.): 121
 Silver Cloud II: 2,417
 Silver Cloud II Long Wheelbase: 258
 Silver Cloud II coachbuilder styles (convertibles, coupes etc.): 107
 Silver Cloud III: 2,044
 Silver Cloud III Long Wheelbase: 206
 Silver Cloud III coachbuilder styles (convertibles, coupes etc.): 328

Popular culture
A silver 1962 Silver Cloud II appeared prominently in every episode of  Aaron Spelling's Burke's Law (1963 TV series) and Burke's Law (1994 TV series), as the personal transport of millionaire detective Amos Burke. The unusual car, for a working police detective, featured in many show storylines, which included efforts by Burke to seduce females tangential to the weekly murder.

A black 1965 Silver Cloud III 'Chinese eye' Mulliner Park Ward drophead coupé previously owned by Jimmy Savile was prominently featured in the 1966 Michelangelo Antonioni film Blowup.

A white 1965 Silver Cloud III featured prominently in The Avengers episode "Mission: Highly Improbable" broadcast November 1967.

In a 1971 song called "Up to Me", the British rock band Jethro Tull refers to this car with the lyric "I'll buy a Silver Cloud to ride."

A black Silver Cloud III was given away as the grand prize in a sweepstakes in the 1985's The Wrestling Classic.

Footnotes

References

External links

 Production figure sources
 Video (RT 09:51) Review of 1958 Silver Cloud I.

Rolls-Royce Silver Cloud
Cars introduced in 1955
Cars discontinued in 1966
Rolls-Royce Silver Cloud
Limousines
Rear-wheel-drive vehicles
Silver Cloud
Coupés
Convertibles